Valtteri Viktor Bottas (born 28 August 1989) is a Finnish racing driver currently competing in Formula One for Alfa Romeo, having previously driven for Mercedes from  to  and Williams from  to . Bottas has scored  race wins and  podiums.

Bottas started his racing career in karting, later advancing to single-seater championships such as the Formula Renault UK Winter Series, Formula Renault Eurocup and the Formula Renault Northern European Cup, winning the latter two in 2008. In 2009, he moved up to the Formula 3 Euroseries, finishing third in the championship and also winning the Masters of Formula 3 event. In 2010, he was hired as a test driver for the Williams Formula One team, a position he would retain throughout 2011 and 2012, taking part in 15 Friday Free Practice sessions. In 2011, he also took part in the GP3 Series, winning the championship in the final race of the season.

In 2013, he joined Williams as a full-time driver partnering Pastor Maldonado. He would remain at Williams until 2017, achieving a top championship position of fourth in 2014 and finishing on the podium nine times during his time with Williams. Following Nico Rosberg's decision to retire following the 2016 season, Bottas was signed by Mercedes as his replacement to partner Lewis Hamilton. During his time with Mercedes which would go on to last until 2022, Bottas finished in the top three of the championship four times and won 10 races in addition to 58 podiums. After five constructor championships won alongside Hamilton, he joined Alfa Romeo for the 2022 season.

Early life 
Valtteri was born in Nastola, Finland, on 28 August 1989 to Rauno Bottas and Marianne Välimaa. His father owns a small cleaning company, and his mother is an undertaker. He was educated in Heinola. Bottas served in the army briefly, which is mandatory for adult males in Finland. His military rank is lance corporal.

Early career

Junior formulae
Bottas's interest in motorsport was sparked at the age of six by a chance visit to a karting event that he had seen advertised at his local supermarket while shopping with his grandfather. His racing hero while growing up was compatriot Mika Häkkinen.

Bottas finished eighth in the 2005 Karting World Cup for the P.D.B. Racing Team, using a Gillard chassis and Parilla engines.

Bottas won both the 2008 Formula Renault Eurocup and the 2008 Formula Renault Northern European Cup. In doing so, he repeated the feat of Filipe Albuquerque, who won both the NEC and Eurocup in the same season, in 2006.

Bottas would have also won the 2007 Formula Renault UK Winter Series, had he been holding an MSA-registered licence for the championship. This did not stop him from competing, and he won three out of the four races in the championship.

Formula Three 
He moved up into the Formula Three Euroseries for the 2009 season, competing for reigning champions ART Grand Prix. Despite not winning a race, Bottas set two pole positions on his way to third in the championship, edging out future BMW i Andretti Motorsport driver Alexander Sims at the final race. In June 2009, Bottas won the 2009 Masters of Formula 3, also claiming the pole position and setting the fastest lap of the race. By winning the event again in 2010, he became the first driver to win the F3 Masters title for the second time.

In 2010, Bottas was assigned test driver for the Williams Formula One team and would continue as such for the 2011 and 2012 (where he took part in 15 Friday Free Practice sessions) seasons. Also in 2011, he contested the GP3 Series, remaining with F3 squad ART. After a tough start to the season, he claimed a win in each of the last four race weekends and secured the title by winning the penultimate race ahead of his teammate and future Jaguar Racing driver James Calado.

Formula One

Williams (2013–2016)

2013

Bottas returned to racing in 2013, as he was confirmed as teammate to Pastor Maldonado at Williams-Renault for the  season on 28 November 2012. On 8 June 2013, Bottas qualified in 3rd position at the  behind Sebastian Vettel (1st), and Lewis Hamilton (2nd). This result allowed Bottas to finish ahead of Maldonado in the Drivers' Championship.

2014

On 11 November 2013, Bottas was confirmed to continue with Williams-Mercedes in 2014 alongside Felipe Massa, who was signed from Ferrari to replace Pastor Maldonado. At the first race of the 2014 season in Australia, Bottas qualified 10th and finished 6th, after recovering from a crash earlier in the race. He was later promoted to 5th after Daniel Ricciardo was disqualified from 2nd position. After achieving three more podiums in Belgium, Russia (where he set his first fastest lap of a race) and Abu Dhabi (part of the Williams team's first double podium since the 2005 Monaco Grand Prix), Bottas finished 4th overall in the Drivers' Championship, beating the likes of former world champions Sebastian Vettel and Fernando Alonso.

2015

In September 2014, it was announced that Bottas and Massa would retain their drives with Williams for the  season. At the opening race of the season in Australia, Bottas qualified sixth for the race, but injured his back during qualifying. He was taken to The Alfred Hospital for precautionary checks, where he was diagnosed with soft tissue damage to his lower back, and was not medically cleared to race. Both Bottas's and Williams's season did not live up to their hopes. Williams lost out in the development war to Ferrari over the winter and slipped further behind Mercedes. Bottas achieved two podium finishes across the 2015 season. The first came at the Canadian Grand Prix when Kimi Räikkönen's Ferrari experienced an engine mapping issue resulting in him spinning, leaving an easy podium opportunity for the Williams driver.  The second podium of the season came in Mexico behind the Mercedes duo. Two races earlier, Bottas had been on course to finish third in Russia before Räikkönen collided with him while trying to overtake on the final lap of the race. Sergio Pérez was rewarded with the podium, while Räikkönen was penalised, dropping him to 8th and Bottas retired. Bottas finished 5th in the Drivers' Championship beating his experienced teammate Felipe Massa for the second consecutive year.

2016

Bottas and Massa remained teammates at Williams for the  season. They were the only two drivers to achieve points finishes in all of the first five races of the season. Bottas claimed third place at the Canadian Grand Prix, matching his result of the previous year. This turned out to be Williams's only podium finish of the season. The second half of the season was less eventful for Bottas. He finished 8th in the Drivers' Championship, once again ahead of his teammate Massa's 11th place. He also out-qualified his teammate 17–4 throughout the season.

Mercedes (2017–2021)

2017
On 16 January 2017, Mercedes announced that they had signed Bottas for the 2017 season to partner Lewis Hamilton, replacing 2016 World Champion Nico Rosberg following his retirement from the sport. Bottas finished 3rd in his first race as a Mercedes driver, the 2017 Australian Grand Prix, behind Sebastian Vettel and Lewis Hamilton. At the 2017 Chinese Grand Prix he spun behind the safety car and fell from 5th to 12th but managed to fight his way back to 6th place behind Lewis Hamilton, Sebastian Vettel, the two Red Bulls and Kimi Räikkönen.

He managed to qualify on pole ahead of Lewis Hamilton at the 2017 Bahrain Grand Prix, marking his first career pole position. In the race, he finished in third place after suffering from tyre pressure problems during his first stint and being unable to find the pace to battle Vettel and Hamilton.

He won the 2017 Russian Grand Prix on 30 April 2017, his first Grand Prix win, after jumping the Ferraris of Sebastian Vettel and Kimi Räikkönen from 3rd on the grid on the first lap, making him the fifth Finn to win a Grand Prix. He retired from 3rd in the next race in Spain with an engine issue, having previously survived a collision with Verstappen and Räikkönen on the first lap that took the other two drivers out of the race. Mercedes was off the pace in Monaco, struggling to generate heat in the tyres. Nevertheless, Bottas qualified 3rd, less than a tenth of a second off the pole time, while his teammate, Lewis Hamilton, could only qualify 14th. Bottas finished 4th in the race.

Bottas finished 2nd in Canada, behind teammate Hamilton, followed by a recovery drive in Azerbaijan to 2nd, having been in last place and a lap down following a collision with Räikkönen on the first lap. He used the multiple safety cars and red flag period to catch up to the pack and the ensuing chaos and drama in front of him allowed him to eventually snatch 2nd at the last moment of the last lap from Lance Stroll. Bottas topped this at the next race with a pole and victory at Austria, holding off Sebastian Vettel's charging Ferrari towards the end of the race, putting him only 15 points behind Hamilton in the championship.

Having started the next race in Britain in 9th, following a five-place grid penalty for a new gearbox, he made his way up the field to 3rd and eventually finished 2nd, behind Hamilton, courtesy of a late-race tyre failure for Ferrari's Kimi Räikkönen. In Hungary, he qualified and finished 3rd, with Hamilton giving him the position on the last corner of the last lap after he let Hamilton go through to attack the Ferraris.

After the summer break, Bottas finished 5th in Belgium, having started 3rd, as he was overtaken by both Ricciardo and Räikkönen after the safety car restart, while his teammate Lewis Hamilton won the race. He qualified 6th in Italy (he would start 4th due to penalties for the Red Bulls), more than 2 seconds slower than pole-sitter Lewis Hamilton. He recovered to finish 2nd. In Singapore, he qualified 6th and good strategy meant that he finished the race in 3rd following the four-car collision on the first lap that occurred in front of him. He then finished off the podium for the next three races, while Hamilton racked up two wins and a 2nd place, as Mercedes clinched their fourth consecutive Constructors' Championship in the USA. He got his third pole position of the season at the Brazilian Grand Prix, followed by his fourth pole and third win at the last race of the season in Abu Dhabi.

2018

On 13 September 2017, Mercedes announced that Bottas would be driving for them once again in the 2018 season. Bottas started the season poorly in Australia, where he crashed out in Q3 and was given a five-place grid penalty for changing his gearbox as a result, meaning he would start the race in 15th place; his teammate Hamilton started the race from pole. In the race, Bottas made it up to the eighth place, benefiting from the virtual safety car as well as performing a few overtakes on a track where it is difficult to pass cars.
Bottas bounced back in Bahrain by putting his car third on the grid, behind the Ferraris of Vettel and Räikkönen but ahead of Hamilton who qualified fourth. In the race, Bottas got past Räikkönen, at the start. At the end of the race, Vettel's tyres began to go off quickly, and Bottas closed the gap to Vettel to within a second and eventually finished second, with Hamilton just a few seconds behind him.

Bottas again out-qualified his teammate to take third place on the grid, as the Ferraris locked out the front row again, in China. He again pounced on Räikkönen at the start, after his fellow Finn had been squeezed by Vettel, and moved up to second. He then managed to overtake Vettel during the first pit stop phase and took the lead with a move around the outside of Räikkönen, who had yet to pit, at the first corner. When the Toro Rossos of Brendon Hartley and Pierre Gasly collided and forced a safety car period, both Bottas and Vettel had passed the pit entrance and were unable to stop for fresh tyres. Both the Red Bulls pitted for softer and faster soft tyres. Ricciardo came through the field from sixth place and performed an audacious overtake on Bottas with only eight laps to go. Bottas finished second in the race and remained third in the championship, and 14 points behind leader Vettel.

At the next race, in Baku, Bottas again qualified third, behind Vettel and Hamilton. He remained in third for the first period of the race, but when both Hamilton and Vettel pitted for new tyres Bottas inherited the lead. He stayed out for 15 more laps until the Red Bulls collided and brought out the safety car. When the safety car came in, with less than a handful of laps to go, Vettel tried to pass into turn 1 and ran wide, and consequently fell to fifth place. With just two laps to go, Bottas ran over a piece of debris, sustained a right rear puncture and retired from the race, handing Hamilton the victory. This meant that Bottas fell to fourth in the championship, 30 points behind Hamilton in first.

Ahead of the German Grand Prix, Bottas signed a new contract with Mercedes for the 2019 season with an option for the 2020 season.

By the end of the season, Bottas became the first Mercedes driver to finish a season without a win since Michael Schumacher in 2012. With seven second-place finishes, he also set a new record for the most second-place finishes without taking a win in a season.

2019

Bottas was again signed to race with Mercedes for the 2019 season alongside world champion Lewis Hamilton. In the first race weekend of the year in Australia, Bottas qualified second fastest behind Hamilton. On Sunday, 17 March, race day, he overtook Hamilton into turn 1 and he held the position the whole race after some stellar driving. He also recorded the fastest lap of the race and therefore gained the extra point awarded to the driver who records the fastest race lap, according to the 2019 regulations. He carried on to win by over 20 seconds to his nearest rival and team-mate Lewis Hamilton.

In Bahrain he finished 2nd to his team-mate for another one-two. In the following race in China, Formula 1's 1,000th race, he took pole for the first time since Russia 2018. His teammate jumped him at the start and stayed there for the entire race to win. Bottas meanwhile finished 2nd to give Mercedes their third one-two in a row for 2019.

In Azerbaijan, he took his second consecutive pole position, securing a front-row lockout alongside his teammate Hamilton, subsequently converting his position on the grid into the fifth race victory of his career and his second of 2019. Hamilton finished second, making it Mercedes' fourth consecutive one-two finish.

In Spain, he took yet another pole position and secured another front-row lockout alongside his teammate. Bottas went on to finish second behind Hamilton, making it the team's fifth one-two in a row.

In the following race, the Monaco Grand Prix, Bottas qualified 2nd, behind team-mate Hamilton, breaking his streak of three consecutive poles, starting from China. He eventually finished 3rd, behind Sebastian Vettel and ahead of Red Bull's Max Verstappen, who faced a five-second penalty for an unsafe release into the pit lane, into Bottas. This was the first race in 2019 to not have a Mercedes 1–2 on the podium as Vettel took 2nd ahead of Bottas. This race extended Hamilton's lead over Bottas in the Drivers' Championship to 17 points.

For the British Grand Prix at Silverstone, Bottas held off Hamilton to take pole position with a 0.006 second faster time; poor timing of the safety car resulted in Hamilton taking the lead and victory of the race. Both Mercedes drivers finished ahead of Ferrari's Charles Leclerc who finished third. The last two races before the 2019 summer break, the German Grand Prix and Hungarian Grand Prix did not go well for Bottas. Due to a small mistake in wet conditions, he crashed during the German Grand Prix and retired from the race. In the first lap during the Hungarian Grand Prix, Charles Leclerc clipped the front wing of Bottas' car, forcing an extra pit stop and causing him to fall back down the order. Bottas eventually finished the race in 8th place.

At the end of the summer break before the Belgian Grand Prix, Bottas was confirmed to drive for Mercedes again in 2020, after the team decided not to promote reserve driver Esteban Ocon. Bottas took his first victory in thirteen races at the Japanese Grand Prix. In Mexico, he crashed heavily at the end of the final qualifying session, before eventually finishing the race in 3rd place. Bottas took his seventh career victory at the following race in the United States. Despite his victory, this race saw the end of Bottas' 2019 championship hopes, as teammate Hamilton finished 2nd to clinch the World Driver's Championship title. Bottas suffered an engine failure in Brazil leading to his second retirement of the season, and ended the season with a 4th-place finish in Abu Dhabi.

Bottas finished the 2019 season in 2nd place in the championship with 326 points, the most successful season of his career to date. He recorded four wins, fifteen podium finishes, five pole positions and three fastest laps.

2020

He set the fastest time in pre-season testing at the Circuit de Barcelona-Catalunya.

Bottas took pole position at the season-opening  and led the race from start to finish. Before the Styrian Grand Prix, it was revealed that Bottas and his team Mercedes were under investigation by the FIA for potentially breaching COVID-19 safety protocols after he returned home to Monaco. Whilst it was initially reported that Mercedes would receive warning letters, Bottas and Mercedes were eventually cleared of any wrongdoing. Bottas qualified fourth in wet conditions for the Styrian Grand Prix and went on to finish second in the race behind Hamilton, cutting his championship lead to six points. He was able to recover to third place by the end of the Grand Prix but lost the lead of the championship to Hamilton.

He ran closely behind Hamilton for most of the race but fell back in the closing laps before suffering a tyre failure with four laps remaining. He returned to the pits for a tyre change and eventually crossed the finish line in 11th place. Bottas secured pole position at the following week's 70th Anniversary Grand Prix, but tyre issues for the Mercedes cars allowed Max Verstappen to pass both and win the race. Bottas fell to third place behind Hamilton in the closing laps. This result caused Bottas to drop to third place in the drivers' championship. Bottas qualified second for the  but lost positions at the start and finished third behind Verstappen. Verstappen's retirement in the race allowed Bottas to regain second place in the drivers' championship, 47 points behind Hamilton.

The race was red-flagged on lap seven after a multi-car accident, and Bottas lost the lead of the race to Hamilton shortly after the restart, eventually finishing second. Shortly afterwards, Bottas complained of power loss and was forced to retire from the race, extending Hamilton's championship lead to 69 points. Bottas finished second at both the Portuguese and Emilia Romagna Grands Prix. He took pole position at the latter, but took damage from debris in the early laps and fell to third before Verstappen retired with a tyre failure.

Both Mercedes cars struggled for pace during the wet  qualifying session, with Bottas qualifying ninth. The rain continued during the race and Bottas spun six times after damaging his front wing due to contact with the Renault of Esteban Ocon, finishing a lap behind eventual race winner Hamilton in 14th place. This gave Hamilton an unassailable 110-point lead over Bottas in the drivers' championship, resulting in Hamilton claiming his seventh world title. At the Bahrain Grand Prix, Bottas qualified 2nd before suffering a puncture during an early safety car period, dropping him right to the back. He eventually finished in 8th place. At the following Sakhir Grand Prix, Hamilton was unable to race and was replaced by George Russell. Bottas qualified on pole for the race and was passed by Russell into turn 1. In the second stint of the race, Bottas began catching Russell before a spin by Jack Aitken brought out the safety car. When Russell went into the pits for a tyre change, he was mistakenly fitted with Bottas' tyres, causing Bottas a slow stop of almost half a minute before getting sent out without a tyre change. When the race restarted Bottas suffered against cars on much fresher tyres, falling from 4th to 8th by the end of the race. In the final race of the year at the Abu Dhabi Grand Prix, Bottas qualified and finished 2nd ahead of Hamilton, capping off a mixed season. Bottas finished the Driver's Championship in 2nd with 223 points, recording two wins, five pole positions, eleven podiums, and two fastest laps.

2021

Bottas extended his contract with Mercedes into . At the Bahrain Grand Prix, he finished third. At the Emilia Romagna Grand Prix, he struggled compared to his teammate Lewis Hamilton, unable to work his tyres and stuck in the ninth position. Bottas' difficult race concluded with a retirement, after a crash with George Russell as the latter was attempting to overtake Bottas. At the Portuguese Grand Prix, Bottas qualified on pole position but was passed by Hamilton and later Verstappen. Despite showing better pace than Verstappen in the late stages of the race, a sensor issue deprived him of challenging for second. He achieved the same result at the Spanish Grand Prix after qualifying third and being overtaken by Leclerc at the start. At the Monaco Grand Prix, Bottas was challenging for pole position, until Charles Leclerc crashed at the 16th corner, causing a red flag to be displayed and qualifying to be immediately ended before Bottas could complete his lap. Due to this, Bottas started third on the grid. He was promoted to second after Charles Leclerc could not start the race due to a car issue. His race, ended on lap 31 after his team was unable to remove a wheel during a routine pitstop.

At the Azerbaijan Grand Prix, he qualified in 10th place, after a red flag prevented him and other drivers from setting a second flying lap in the third and final session, and was unable to make up positions in the race, eventually finishing 12th, ahead of only the Haas cars, Nicholas Latifi and his teammate Hamilton, who had made a mistake on lap 50. At the French Grand Prix, Bottas qualified in 3rd place behind teammate Hamilton and Verstappen. In the final stages of the race, he struggled with tyre wear, as he had pit early to undercut Verstappen, and was passed by Verstappen and Pérez, finishing 4th. In the Styrian Grand Prix, Bottas qualified 2nd ahead of Hamilton but was demoted to fifth due to a penalty for dangerously spinning in the pitlane in FP2. During the race, he overtook the McLaren of Lando Norris using DRS and undercut Pérez during the pitstop phase, and despite coming under pressure from the two-stopping Red Bull at the end of the race, finished 3rd, his first podium since Spain. In the Austrian Grand Prix, he qualified 5th directly behind Hamilton. During the race, several close battles resulted in cars being forced off-track and drivers receiving time penalties. Hamilton suffered damage to his car and the team ordered Hamilton to allow Bottas to overtake him. Bottas finished 2nd behind Verstappen. At the Italian Grand Prix, Bottas took first in the Friday qualifying session and went on to win the sprint qualifying on Saturday, but incurred grid penalties for changing components. Starting from last in the race, he eventually fought back to 3rd, behind the two McLarens of Daniel Ricciardo and Lando Norris. In the Russian Grand Prix, Bottas qualified 7th in tricky conditions but was demoted to 17th after another engine change. During the race he was passed by Verstappen early on in the race and suffered from understeer, yet recovered to 5th after a well-timed pitstop for intermediate tyres on the rapidly dampening track.

At the Turkish Grand Prix, Bottas qualified 2nd behind teammate Hamilton but started on pole after Hamilton incurred a grid penalty. Bottas comfortably led most of the race from Verstappen until his pitstop. After pitting for new inters he easily passed Leclerc's Ferrari and went on to achieve his first and only victory of the year, over 14 seconds ahead of 2nd placed Verstappen. At the following United States Grand Prix, Bottas qualified 4th but was forced to take yet another engine penalty, thus starting 9th. Bottas struggled with dirty air throughout the race, which made overtaking difficult, but he managed to climb back to 6th after overtaking the Ferrari of Carlos Sainz on the last lap. At the Mexico City Grand Prix, Bottas qualified on pole position despite the Red Bulls of Verstappen and Pérez looking faster all weekend. He suffered a poor start in the race and was tagged by Daniel Ricciardo going into Turn 1, sending him to the back of the field. Having suffered from a poor pitstop and being stuck behind Ricciardo for much of the race, he was pit by Mercedes to take the fastest lap off Verstappen, thus maintaining Mercedes' lead over Red Bull in the constructors' championship. In the São Paulo Grand Prix, Bottas qualified in 3rd, but due to a disqualification from qualifying for Hamilton, he started that week's sprint race from the front row. A good start on the soft tyres meant he jumped Verstappen at the start, and he went on to win the sprint. In the race on Sunday, Bottas was passed by both Red Bulls on the opening lap after contact with Verstappen. Bottas let Hamilton past and re-overtook Pérez during the pitstop phase, ending the race in third.

Alfa Romeo (2022–) 

He is partnered by rookie Zhou Guanyu. In the season-opening Bahrain Grand Prix, Bottas achieved a sixth-place finish even after a poor start. In the second race in Saudi Arabia, he retired his car on lap 46 due to a cooling issue. At the 2022 Emilia Romagna Grand Prix, Bottas set a target of a top five finish. In qualifying he suffered from reliability issues, managing to qualify eighth in tricky conditions. During the sprint and the race he made up multiple positions to finish fifth, with a poor pitstop of over 10 seconds costing him a chance to fight Russell for fourth place. At the Miami Grand Prix, Bottas qualified fifth despite almost no running in practice. During the race, he comfortably maintained his position ahead of Hamilton until a late-race safety car. Once the race was resumed, Bottas faced pressure from both Mercedes, as Russell had taken advantage of the safety car to fit new tyres while the rest of the field were on worn hards compound tyres. On lap 50, Bottas made a mistake going into the last corner, outbreaking himself and tapping the wall, which allowed both his pursuers to overtake him. Bottas finished the race in seventh. At the Spanish Grand Prix, Bottas qualified seventh and temporarily moved up to fourth in the race. Alfa Romeo opted to place Bottas on a one-stop strategy, which eventually allowed both Hamilton and Sainz to overtake him as his tyres faded away, finishing sixth. At the Monaco Grand Prix, Bottas qualified 12th, managing to finish in ninth place in the changing conditions. At the Azerbaijan Grand Prix, Bottas was outqualified for the first time by his teammate and finished outside of the points, lacking the pace to fight with the upper midfield. Zhou again managed to outqualify Bottas in Canada, but Bottas took advantage of a late-race safety car to jump to eighth. On the last lap, he attempted to overtake the Alpine of Alonso but was repeatedly blocked. After the race the stewards gave Alonso a five-second penalty for weaving, allowing Bottas and Zhou to finish seventh and eighth, Alfa's first double-points score since Bahrain. In the following British Grand Prix, Bottas was knocked out in Q2 again, recovering up to ninth before retiring from a gearbox issue on lap 20.
 At the Austrian Grand Prix, Bottas made up places at the start to finish 10th in the sprint race, he finished 11th in the main race.

Rallying and other racing 
In January 2019, Bottas took part in the Arctic Rally, recording a stage win and finishing fifth overall. In December 2019, he won the Paul Ricard-based Rallycircuit Côte d'Azur.  In 2020, Bottas again participated in the Arctic Lapland Rally, where he drove a Citroën DS3 WRC car and finished ninth. He later partook in an Extreme E test in October 2020, alongside Jean-Éric Vergne and Sébastien Loeb. In January 2021, Bottas competed in his third Arctic Lapland Rally. He scored a class podium and finished sixth overall.

Bottas was set to make his Race of Champions debut in 2022, partnering two-time Formula One champion Mika Häkkinen. However, he dropped out of the event last minute. Instead, Bottas is set to race in the 2023 Race of Champions alongside Häkkinen.

Personal life
On 11 September 2016, Bottas married his long-time girlfriend, Emilia Pikkarainen, a fellow Finn and an Olympic swimmer whom he had been dating since 2010. The couple were married at St. John's Church in Helsinki. On 28 November 2019, Bottas announced their separation and divorce, citing the "challenges my career and life situation bring". Since February 2020, Bottas has been in a relationship with Australian cyclist Tiffany Cromwell.

Bottas resides in Monaco, and also has a lake house in his native Finland.

Other ventures and philanthropy 
Bottas co-owns coffee roastery “Kahiwa Coffee Roasters” in Lahti, Finland.

In 2017, Bottas launched the Valtteri Bottas Duathlon, an annual sporting event held in Finland. Bottas uses the Valtteri Bottas Duathlon to raise money for charity and various “good causes”.

In April 2022, Bottas, in partnership with his girlfriend, Australian cyclist Tiffany Cromwell, launched Oath, a premier gin with inspiration borrowed from their family heritages of Finland and Australia.

Bottas is a co-founder and partner of FNLD GRVL, a gravel cycling event in Lahti, Finland. He is partnered with Amy Charity of SBT GRVL and Tiffany Cromwell.

Awards 
 Sky Sports Award for Most Improved Driver 2014
 Confartigianato Motori Driver of the Year 2017
 Lorenzo Bandini Trophy 2018
 DHL Fastest Lap Award 2018
 AKK-Motorsport Driver of the Year 2019

Karting record

Karting career summary

Racing record

Racing career summary 

† As Bottas was a guest driver, he was ineligible for points.
 Season still in progress.

Complete Eurocup Formula Renault 2.0 results
(key) (Races in bold indicate pole position; races in italics indicate fastest lap.)

Complete Formula 3 Euro Series results
(key) (Races in bold indicate pole position; races in italics indicate fastest lap.)

† Driver did not finish the race but was classified as he completed over 90% of the race distance.

Complete GP3 Series results
(key) (Races in bold indicate pole position; races in italics indicate fastest lap.)

Complete Formula One results
(key) (Races in bold indicate pole position; races in italics indicates fastest lap.)

 Did not finish, but was classified as he had completed more than 90% of the race distance.
 Season still in progress.

References

External links

 
 ESPN Profile

	

1989 births
Living people
British Formula Renault 2.0 drivers
British Formula Three Championship drivers
Formula Renault Eurocup drivers
Finnish expatriates in Monaco
Finnish Formula One drivers
Finnish racing drivers
Formula 3 Euro Series drivers
Formula One race winners
Formula Renault 2.0 NEC drivers
GP3 Series Champions
Finnish GP3 Series drivers
People from Nastola
Williams Formula One drivers
Mercedes-Benz Formula One drivers
Koiranen GP drivers
Motopark Academy drivers
ART Grand Prix drivers
Prema Powerteam drivers
Double R Racing drivers
Alfa Romeo Formula One drivers
Sportspeople from Päijät-Häme
Karting World Championship drivers